"In My Head" is a song performed by Swedish pop singer and music producer Loreen, it was released as the fifth single from her debut studio album Heal (2012). The song was written by Loreen, Moh Denebi, Björn Djupström and produced by Tortuga. It was released as a digital download on 14 February 2013 in Sweden. The track was originally planned to be the single that launched her album Heal last October but "Crying Out Your Name" was eventually chosen.

The release features a single edit, which is just under a minute shorter than the album version. And it also features the Promise Land remix, both in a radio edit and an extended edit. The Promise Land remix gives ‘In My Head’ a slightly more club friendly feel, similarly to what the international version of "Crying Out Your Name" in 2012.

Critical reception
In the review of the album, Scandipop said, (of 'In My Head'); "The frantic piano middle eight is pure beauty". They added 'In My Head' "seems like the no brainer to be the next single after Crying Out Your Name ".

Live performances
Loreen performed "In My Head" live at The Qube in Belgium on December 3, 2012.

Loreen performed an acoustic version of "In My Head" live on Musikhjälpen on December 13, 2012.

Loreen performed "In My Head" live at the P3 Guld Awards in Gothenburg on January 19, 2013.

Loreen performed an acoustic version of "In My Head" live in the Vakna studios on February 19, 2013

Track listing
Digital download 
 In My Head (Promise Land Radio Edit)  - 3:29 
 In My Head (Single Edit)   - 3:41 
 In My Head (Promise Land Extended)  - 5:29

Release history

References

2012 songs
2013 singles
Loreen (singer) songs
Eurodance songs
Songs written by Moh Denebi
Songs written by Björn Djupström